Gar Faqir (also Romanized as Gār Faqīr) is a village in Bahu Kalat Rural District, Dashtiari District, Chabahar County, Sistan and Baluchestan Province, Iran. At the 2006 census, its population was 495, in 118 families.

References 

Populated places in Chabahar County